SS Melita was one of a pair of transatlantic steam ocean liners that were built in the United Kingdom, launched in 1917 and operated by Canadian Pacific until 1935.

In 1935 Flotte Riuniti Cosulich-Lloyd Sabaudo obtained both ships, renamed them, and converted them into troop ships for the Italian government. Melita was renamed Liguria, and in 1936 passed to Lloyd Triestino.

In 1940 a British aircraft torpedoed Liguria in the Mediterranean. In 1941 Italian forces scuttled her at Tobruk. Her wreck was raised, and in 1950 it was scrapped.

Building
In 1913 Hamburg America Line ordered a pair of liners from Barclay, Curle & Co. During that war Canadian Pacific (CP) bought the two partly built ships and had them completed to its specification.

Barclay, Curle & Co built Melita in Glasgow as yard number 517 and launched her on 24 April 1917. She was then towed to Belfast where Harland & Wolff installed her engines. Her Harland & Wolff yard number was 463.

Melita had three screws. A pair of four-cylinder triple-expansion steam engines drove her port and starboard screws. Exhaust steam from their low-pressure cylinders powered a low-pressure steam turbine that drove her middle screw.

Her holds included  of refrigerated space.

Just before the First World War, CP was developing the idea of cabin class to replace both first and second class. Accordingly it had Melita and Minnedosa fitted out with only two classes of passenger accommodation. Melita had berths for 550 passengers in cabin class and 1,200 in third class.

UK service
CP took delivery of Melita on 12 January 1918. Her maiden voyage was from Liverpool to St John, New Brunswick, but her regular route was between Liverpool and New York. In 1919 the UK Government chartered her for one voyage from Glasgow to Bombay.

In 1920 Melita was overhauled in Antwerp. From 1922 to 1927 her route was between Antwerp and St John via Southampton. In 1925 Palmers Shipbuilding and Iron Company refitted her in Jarrow.

In 1927 CP put Melita on its route between Britain, Quebec and Montreal. In 1932 Melita made her final transatlantic crossing, which was from Liverpool, Belfast and Greenock to Halifax, Nova Scotia and St John. She had crossed the North Atlantic 146 times.

From 1932 Melita was laid up, but then CP then used her to run a series of cruises from Glasgow. In 1935 CP sold Melita and Minnedosa to breakers in Italy.

Murder of Captain Clews
In the early hours of 21 October 1925 Melita was in port in Antwerp when her Chief Officer, Thomas Towers, shot dead her Master, AH Clews, as the latter slept in his cabin. Towers also shot the Assistant Chief Engineer, David Gilmour, in the head, but without killing him. Other officers then overpowered Towers, but in the struggle he twice shot the Second Engineer, John Holliday, in the chest. Towers tried to shoot himself in the head, but failed.

Belgian police arrested Towers, who blamed Clews and others for "trying to wreck his career". The police then put him back aboard to be surrendered to British police. Gilmour and Holliday were initially treated in hospital in Antwerp, where one of the bullets was removed from Holliday's lung. The next day Melita reached Southampton, where a police launch put a surgeon aboard to treat Gilmour and Holliday, and Towers was removed under arrest.

Captain Clews was the nephew of the banker Henry Clews (1834–1923). Towers was found insane and detained at His Majesty's pleasure in Broadmoor Hospital.

Italian service
The sale contract specified that the two ships must be broken up. This clause was breached when the pair were passed to Flotte Riuniti Cosulich-Lloyd Sabaudo, who had them refitted as troop ships for the Italian Government. Melita was renamed Liguria. In 1936 she was transferred to Lloyd Triestino.

On 5 July 1940 a British aircraft torpedoed Melita in the Mediterranean, but she stayed afloat and reached port in Tobruk. When British and Australian forces captured Tobruk the retreating Italians scuttled Melita in the approach to Tobruk harbour on 22 January 1941.

Melita was later refloated. In 1950 her wreck was towed to Savona, where she arrived on 31 August to be scrapped.

References

Bibliography

External links
 – historic photographs of Melita in Canadian Pacific service

1917 ships
1925 murders in Europe
Maritime incidents in 1940
Maritime incidents in 1941
Ocean liners of the United Kingdom
Passenger ships of Italy
Ships built in Glasgow
Ships built by Harland and Wolff
Ships built in Ireland
Ships sunk by British aircraft
Steamships of Italy
Steamships of the United Kingdom